Sar Khareh-ye Olya (also Romanized as Sar Khareh-ye ‘Olyā and Sarkhareh-ye ‘Olyā; also known as Şafā’īyeh) is a village in Cham Khalaf-e Isa Rural District, Cham Khalaf-e Isa District, Hendijan County, Khuzestan Province, Iran. At the 2006 census, its population was 170, in 35 families.

References 

Populated places in Hendijan County